The calendar of saints is a traditional Christian method of organizing a liturgical year by associating each day with one or more saints.

Calendar of saints may more specifically refer to:
Calendar of saints (Anglican Church of Australia)
Calendar of saints (Anglican Church of Canada)
Calendar of saints (Anglican Church of Korea)
Calendar of saints (Anglican Church of Southern Africa)
Calendar of saints (Armenian Apostolic Church)
Calendar of saints (Church of England)
Calendar of saints (Church in Wales)
Calendar of saints (Episcopal Church)
Calendar of saints (Episcopal Anglican Church of Brazil)
Calendar of saints (Hong Kong Sheng Kung Hui)
Calendar of saints (Lutheran)
General Roman Calendar of 1960 - calendar of saints used by the Roman Catholic Church
Calendar of saints (Scottish Episcopal Church)